Świerznica is a village in the administrative district of Gmina Stegna, Nowy Dwór Gdański County, Pomeranian Voivodeship, Poland.

Before 1793 the area was part of Polish Royal Prussia, in 1793-1919 Prussia and Germany, 1920-1939 the Free City of Danzig, 1939-45 Nazi Germany. It became Polish in 1945. For the history of the region, see History of Pomerania.

The village has a population of 142.

References

Villages in Nowy Dwór Gdański County